

League tables

Group I

Group II

Group III

Group IV

Group V

Group VI

Group VII

Group VIII

Group IX

Group X

Group XI

Group XII

Group XIII

Group XIV

Promotion playoff

First round

Final Round

Season records
 Most wins: 32, Badajoz.
 Most draws: 18, Mérida.
 Most losses: 30, Gavà.
 Most goals for: 112, Sevilla Atlético.
 Most goals against: 123, Rute.
 Most points: 70, Sevilla Atlético.
 Fewest wins: 1, Atlético Camocha and Gavà.
 Fewest draws: 2, Telde.
 Fewest losses: 1, Sevilla Atlético.
 Fewest goals for: 14, San Martín.
 Fewest goals against: 10, Badajoz.
 Fewest points: 9, Gavà.

Notes

External links
www.rsssf.com
www.futbolme.com

Tercera División seasons
4
Spain